Defending champion William Blumberg and his partner Steve Johnson defeated Raven Klaasen and Marcelo Melo in the final, 6–4, 7–5 to win the men's doubles tennis title at the 2022 Hall of Fame Open.

Blumburg and Jack Sock were the reigning champions, but Sock did not participate.

Seeds

Draw

Draw

References

External links
 Main draw

Hall of Fame Open - Doubles
2022 Doubles